Musuan Peak or Mount Musuan , also known as Mount Calayo (literally "Fire Mountain") is an active volcano in Maramag, Bukidnon, on the island of Mindanao in the Philippines.

Physical characteristics
Musuan is a lava dome and tuff cone.

Eruptions
The Philippine Institute of Volcanology and Seismology reports that Musuan erupted in 1866 and 1867, but the Smithsonian Institution's Global Volcanism Program records another eruption, possibly phreatic, that "burned everything around it." The explosion supposedly occurred four years before the 1891 visit of a Jesuit priest, who reported that he could not examine the volcano more closely because of strong solfataric activity.

A strong seismic swarm occurred near Musuan in 1976, and again around mid-2011.

Musuan is one of the active volcanoes in the Philippines, which are all part of the Pacific ring of fire.

Flora 

Mount Musuan's northern slope is still covered by a primary rainforest. The rest is covered predominantly by Cogon grass (Imperata cylindrica). Reforestation efforts on the bare areas, both in tree-planting drives and by Central Mindanao University personnel, have established temporary forests of Acacia mangium and conifers.

There are 524 species of plants in Mount Musuan under 353 genera and 135 families. 301 species are trees, 51 shrubs, 50 grasses and sedges, 46 herbs, 42 vines, 31 ferns, and 3 fern allies. 188 species (35%) are economically important, 128 species (24%) are endemic, and 3 (1%) are endangered species. Musuan peak has approximately 6,354 individual trees. The most common tree species (in density and frequency) are the Melanolepis multiglandulosa (Kamala tree) and Colona serratifolia, followed by Clausena brevistyla and Alstonia scholaris (Blackboard tree). Three species  of pteridophytes are locally threatened: Marsilea crenata ("apat-apat"), Ceratopteris thalictroides ("pakung-sungay"), and Lycopodiella cernua (clubmoss). 10 species of pteridophytes are endemic to the area.

History and Infrastructure

Mount Musuan's lack of any visible crater has led to some local skepticism of it being an active volcano. Still, the imagery evoked by its name variant 'Mount Calayo' (Fire Mountain) and the stories told by local Bukidnon tribesmen keeps people wary of the relatively small mountain which doesn't look like a volcano at all.

Valencia City is located North of the peak, the Central Mindanao University (CMU) and Barangay Dologon at the southwest, and the Pulangi River on the entire eastern side.

At the foot of Musuan Peak is the Mount Musuan Zoological and Botanical Garden of the Central Mindanao University. It includes a butterfly greenhouse and a reforestation nursery among its buildings. The Sayre Highway and a research center of the Philippine Carabao Center are located on the western slopes. It has a tourist shop which sells dairy products made from Carabao milk. South of the mountain are the university agricultural facilities including a cattle ranch, a poultry farm, greenhouses, and a dairy.

Due to its proximity to the university and the university town proper, it has become a popular destination for students, teachers, and tourists; either for picnics or a study of the flora and fauna of one of the few remnants of the jungles that once covered the valleys of the surrounding areas. From its isolated position in the middle of the valley and the very small surface area of its highest point (only a few meters), the entire countryside is visible from the top. Currently its slopes has been the target of extensive reforestation efforts partly paid for by the establishment of toll gates to hikers intending to go up the mountain.

See also
 List of active volcanoes in the Philippines
 List of potentially active volcanoes in the Philippines
 List of inactive volcanoes in the Philippines
 Philippine Institute of Volcanology and Seismology
 Pulangi River

References

External links
 Philippine Institute of Volcanology and Seismology (PHIVOLCS) Musuan Volcano page (archived)
 

Stratovolcanoes of the Philippines
Subduction volcanoes
Volcanoes of Mindanao
Mountains of the Philippines
Lava domes
Landforms of Bukidnon
Active volcanoes of the Philippines